Liangxiongdiyu Island ("两兄弟屿") is located 67 km northeast of Shenjiamen . It belongs to the Dongji Town of Zhoushan city. Liangxiongdiyu is the baseline point of the Chinese territorial sea.
2006, The stele of "Chinese territorial sea baseline point" erected.

Notes and references

See also
Zhoushanqundao (舟山群岛)
Suyanjiao (Suyan Rock) (苏岩礁)
Sheshandao(佘山岛)
Yushanliedao(渔山列岛)
aizhouliedao(台州列岛)

External links
 Declaration of the Government of the People's Republic of China on the baselines of the territorial sea(May15th, 1996)
中国东海１０座领海基点石碑建成
中华人民共和国政府关于中华人民共和国领海基线的声明(1996年5月15日)

Islands of Zhejiang
Baselines of the Chinese territorial sea